The School of the Arts Foundation, Inc. was founded in 1993 as a 501 (c) (3) non-profit organization with the charter of raising funds to enhance arts and academic programs at the internationally recognized Alexander W. Dreyfoos School of the Arts in West Palm Beach, Florida, in the School District of Palm Beach County. Thousands of donors contribute to the foundation annually, including novelist James Patterson whose wife, Sue Patterson, sits on the Board. The organization has its offices on the campus of the school in the Fine Arts building, and a small professional staff headed by Kris Lidinsky.

References

External links 

1993 establishments in Florida
501(c)(3) organizations
Arts foundations based in the United States
Arts organizations established in 1993